"La pluie" is a song by French singer Orelsan and Belgian singer Stromae. The song peaked at number 2 on the Belgian Ultratop Wallonia Chart and at number 10 on the French Singles Chart.

Charts

Weekly charts

Year-end charts

Certifications

References

2017 singles
2017 songs
French-language songs
Orelsan songs
Stromae songs
Songs written by Orelsan
Songs written by Stromae